Izz ud-Din, Izz al-Din (Arabic: عزّ الدين or commonly written عزّ الدين, ‘izzu ’d-dīn, ‘izza ’d-dīn, in the modern day mostly written as Azzedine or Azzeddine) is an Arabic male given name meaning "high rank (honour, esteem, prestige) of the Islamic religion/ faith". 

The prefix "‘izz" meaning "high rank, honour, esteem, prestige" is also the notions of being respected, cherished, be strong or powerful.

It may refer to:

People
Izz al-Din Usama (12th century), Ayyubid emir
'Izz al-Dīn Qilij Arslān bin Mas'ūd, or Kilij Arslan II (died 1192), Seljuq Sultan of Rum
Izz ad-Din Mas'ud (died 1193), Zangi emir of Mosul
'Izz al-Dīn Kaykā'ũs bin Kaykhusraw, or Kaykaus I (died 1220), Seljuq Sultan of Rum
Ali 'Izz al-Din Ibn al-Athir al-Jazari, also known as Ali ibn al-Athir (1160–1233), Muslim historian
Izz al-Din Aybak (died 1257), Mamluk sultan of Egypt
Izz al-Din `Abd al-Hamid ibn Hibat-Allah ibn Abi al-Hadid al-Mu`tazili al Madaini (died 1258), Shia Mu`tazili Islamic scholar and writer
Izz-ud-din Balban-i-Yuzbaki – Mamluk Governor of Bengal for Mamluk Sultanate (Delhi) from 1257 to 1259.
Izz al-Din ibn Shaddad (1217–1285), Syrian official and historian
Izz al-Dīn Kaykā'ũs bin Kaykhusraw, or Kaykaus II (died c. 1280), Seljuq Sultan of Rum
Izz al-Din Aydamir Al-Jaldaki (died 1342), Persian physician and alchemist
Izz al-Din ibn Rukn al-Din Mahmud (died 1382), Mihrabanid malik of Sistan
 Izz al-Din Shir (d. 1423), founder of the Emirate of Hakkâri
 Muhammad Izz al-Din I (died 1539), leader of the Tayyibi Isma'ili community
Hasan 'Izz ud-din (fl. 1760), king of the Huraa dynasty of the Maldives
Yusuf Izzettin Efendi (1857–1916), Ottoman prince
Izz ad-Din al-Qassam (1882–1935), Palestinian Islamic preacher and resistance fighter
Yusuf Izzuddin Shah of Perak (1890–1963), Sultan of Perak, Malaysia
Ezzel Dine Zulficar (1919–1963), Egyptian film director
Mohammad Ezodin Hosseini Zanjani (1921-2013) Iranian Shia Marja 
Azzeddine Laraki (born 1929), Prime Minister of Morocco
Azzedine Alaia (born 1940), Tunisian fashion designer
Azzedine Boukerche, Canadian engineer
Ezzedine Salim (1943–2004), Iraqi writer and politician
Ramzy Ezzeldin Ramzy (born 1954), Egyptian politician and diplomat
Azzedine Amanallah (born 1956), Moroccan footballer
Ezzeddine Hadj Sassi (born 1962), Tunisian footballer
Izz El-Deen Sheikh Khalil (c. 1963–2004), Palestinian resistance fighter
Hassan Izz-Al-Din (born c. 1963), Lebanese wanted by the United States government
Azzedine Brahmi (born 1966), Algerian long-distance runner
Azzedine Sakhri (born 1968), Algerian long-distance runner
Mansoura Ez-Eldin (born 1976), Egyptian novelist and journalist
Abu Izzadeen (adopted name) (born 1976), British Muslim activist
Azzedine Zerdoum (born 1977), Algerian cross-country runner
Azzedine Benchaïra (born 1978), Algerian footballer
Azzedine (born 1979), screen name of porn star, model and film actor François Sagat during his debut years at Citébeur studios 
Mohamed Izzadeen (born 1979), Sri Lankan footballer
Sofiane Azzedine (born 1980), Algerian footballer
Azzeddine Ourahou (born 1984), Moroccan footballer
Ezzedin Yacoub Hamed, Egyptian long-jumper
Salah Ezzedine, Lebanese businessman accused of running a pyramid scheme

Places
Izz al-Din, Syria, a village in between Hama and Homs
Izzeddin Fortress, Crete
İzzettin, Sındırgı, Turkey

Arabic masculine given names